Pratt & Whitney Rocketdyne (PWR) was an American company that designed and produced rocket engines that use liquid propellants. It was a division of Pratt & Whitney, a fully owned subsidiary of United Technologies Corporation. It was headquartered in Canoga Park, Los Angeles, California. In 2013, the company was sold to GenCorp, becoming part of Aerojet Rocketdyne.

History

Pratt & Whitney Rocketdyne was formed in 2005 when Pratt & Whitney Space Propulsion and Boeing Rocketdyne Propulsion & Power were merged, following the latter's acquisition from Boeing by United Technologies Corporation. Boeing retained the 2,800 acre Rocketdyne Santa Susana Field Laboratory property above Canoga Park while a majority of the engineering and design continued to be carried out at the Pratt & Whitney Space Propulsion facility located on Beeline Highway outside West Palm Beach, Florida.

In July 2012, United Technologies Corporation agreed to sell Pratt & Whitney Rocketdyne to GenCorp, which also owns rocket engine producer Aerojet. The sale was completed in June 2013, when the company was merged with Aerojet to form Aerojet Rocketdyne.

Products

Pratt & Whitney Rocketdyne

 RL10 (LH2/LOX) An American Society of Mechanical Engineers (ASME) Historic Landmark developed by Pratt & Whitney.  Used on the Saturn I, the upper stage of the Delta IV, the Centaur upper stage for the Atlas V and Titan rockets and on the vertical-landing McDonnell Douglas DC-X "Delta Clipper". It was intended to serve as the main propulsion engine for the Altair lunar lander.
 RS-68 (LH2/LOX) First stage engine for the Delta IV.
 RS-25 (LH2/LOX) Space Shuttle main engine.
 SJ61 (JP-7/ingested air) A dual-mode ramjet/scramjet engine flown on the Boeing X-51 hypersonic demonstration vehicle.
 J-2X (LH2/LOX) As of 2013 under development to be used on the Earth Departure Stage for the Block II of the Space Launch System.

See also
 Rocketdyne
 Rocketdyne engines
 Commercial Spaceflight Federation

References

External links

 Pratt & Whitney Rocketdyne company website

Aerojet Rocketdyne Holdings
Rocketdyne
.
Aerospace companies of the United States
Manufacturing companies based in Los Angeles
Defense companies of the United States
Technology companies based in Greater Los Angeles
Canoga Park, Los Angeles
United Technologies
American companies established in 2005
Manufacturing companies established in 2005
Technology companies established in 2005
American companies disestablished in 2013
Manufacturing companies disestablished in 2013
Technology companies disestablished in 2013
2005 establishments in California
2013 disestablishments in California
Defunct companies based in Greater Los Angeles
History of the San Fernando Valley
2013 mergers and acquisitions

pt:Rocketdyne